The Circle Star Theatre was a performing arts venue in San Carlos, San Mateo County, California.  Its name is based on it being a theater in the round, featuring a rotating circular stage with none of its 3,743 seats further than 50 feet (15 m) from the stage. Unlike similar venues across the United States, the Circle Star Theatre stage had the ability to rotate in either direction without limit, thanks to the slip ring and brush system that supplied electrical/audio to and from the stage. The theatre's address was 2 Circle Star Way, San Carlos, CA 94070.

Its original concept when it opened in the early 1960s was a dinner theater similar to the Hyatt House Theatre in nearby Burlingame. Lewis & Dare productions hosted many Broadway touring shows, such as The Odd Couple, with Ernest Borgnine and Don Rickles.

In 1971, the theatre was purchased by Marquee Entertainment, run by Don Jo Medlevine of the famed Chicago nightclub Chez Paree. Marquee Entertainment booked Las Vegas acts such as Frank Sinatra, Sammy Davis, Jr., Dean Martin, and Liberace, among many others. In the mid-1970s the theatre was kept solvent by booking Motown acts to increase its diversity.

Fate 
Don Jo Medlevine sold the Circle Star Theater to Leonard Bloom.  Bloom later sold the theater to a local car dealer.  The new ownership did not have the same elite relationships with the top entertainers as Bloom had, so it was closed in December 1993.  The building caught fire on April 18, 1997, damaging much of the backstage area, though by this time plans had already been made for its demolition.  The theater was ultimately demolished to make way for the Circle Star Center, a complex containing two four-story office buildings and a small hotel, since 2015 or 2014 Softbank owns the buildings and uses them as offices. The hotel is now an Extended Stay America.

Performers

The following musicians, actors, and comedians are among those who appeared at the Circle Star:

Air Supply
Al Green
Ray Charles
Exposé
Chet Atkins
Hank Ballard and the Midnighters
The Beach Boys
Jack Benny
Red Skelton
Jimmy Durante
George Benson
Chuck Berry
Sonny & Cher
Ella Fitzgerald
Cheech and Chong
En Vogue
Bread
Bonnie Bramlett
James Brown
Cameo
George Carlin
Moody Blues
Robert Palmer
Louis Anderson
Rita Rudner
Johnny Carson

The Carpenters
Johnny Cash
Chicago
Judy Collins
Miss Pat Collins, The Hip Hypnotist
Bill Cosby
Sammy Davis, Jr.
DeBarge
John Denver
Chris LeDoux
New Edition
Miami Sound Machine
Mel Tillis
The Animals

Slim Whitman
Boxcar Willie
The Kingston Trio
Roseanne Barr
The Limelighters
Don Ellis
The 5th Dimension
Neil Diamond
Kenny G
Garry Shandling
Foreigner
The Rascals (Reunion Tour)
Marvin Gaye
The Gap Band
Herbie Hancock *Jeffrey Osborne

Hiroshima (band)
Engelbert Humperdinck
Bob Hope
The Jackson 5
The Jets
Jan & Dean
George Jones
Chaka Khan with Rufus
B. B. King
Gladys Knight & The Pips
Leo Kottke
Jerry Lee Lewis
Liberace
Gordon Lightfoot
Little Richard
Melissa Manchester
Barry Manilow 
Richard Marx
Airto Moreira w/ George Duke
Steve Lawrence and Eydie Gormé
Van Morrison
Willie Nelson
The Ohio Players
Con Funk Shun
Tony Orlando & Dawn
Marie Osmond
Ricky Nelson
Tommy James & the Shondells
Buck Owens
Lydia Pense with Cold Blood
The Temptations
Harold Melvin & the Blue Notes featuring Teddy Pendergrass
Alec Baldwin
Richard Pryor
Kenny Rogers & The First Edition
Return to Forever
Kenny Rogers
Diana Ross
Shalamar
Frank Sinatra
The Three Stooges
Tower of Power
Donna Summer
Ike Turner
Roger Troutman
Conway Twitty
Luther Vandross
Dionne Warwick
Grover Washington, Jr.
Barry White
Andy Williams
Wolfe Tones
Holly Dunn
Tim Allen
Julio Iglesias
Tom Jones
Bunny Wailer
The Skatalites
Yvonne Elliman
The Statler Brothers
Carl Perkins
Jerry Seinfeld
Bob Goldthwait
Dave Chappelle
Marsha Warfield
Burt Bacharach
Sha na na
Andy Kaufman
KC and the Sunshine Band
The Lennon Sisters
Oasis
Rick James
Rodney Dangerfield
Roy Orbison 
Benny Goodman
The Oakridge Boys
Crystal Gayle
Dan Seals
Martina McBride
Restless Heart
Frankie Valli and The Four Seasons
The Dave Clark Five
Redd Foxx
Harry Chapin
Jimmy Buffett (with Michael Utley)
Hamilton, Joe Frank & Reynolds
Leo Sayer
Judy Garland
Smokey Robinson
Jean-Luc Ponty
Craig Chaquico
Tony! Toni! Toné!
Bob and Ray
The Spinners
Olivia Newton-John
Bootsy Collins
Yellowman
Howie Mandel
Sam Kinison
Peter, Paul and Mary
Emmylou Harris and the Hot Band
Canned Heat
Linda Ronstadt
LL Cool J
Doobie Brothers
Pia Zadora
Liza Minnelli
George Strait
Toby Keith
Lacy J. Dalton
Tom Wopat (From Dukes of Hazzard)
War (U.S. band)
Big Brother and the Holding Company with "new" singer Janis Joplin
Brenton Wood
Aretha Franklin with King Curtis & the Kingpins
Janis Ian
Stevie Wonder billed as Little Stevie Wonder
The Grass Roots
The Righteous Brothers
Sérgio Mendes and Brasil 77
The Captain and Tennille
Rich Little
Pat Boone
The Smothers Brothers
Tom Waits
Pato Banton
Ziggy Marley
Wayne Newton
Frank Zappa
Fishbone
Untouchables
Trouble Funk
Cleo Laine
Sergio Mendes and Brasil 66
Herb Alpert and the Tijuana Brass
Gallagher
Natalie Cole
Sylvester
Josephine Baker
Robert Palmer (singer)
Louie Anderson
Rita Rudner
Isley Brothers
America
Glen Campbell
The Mills Brothers
Edgar Bergen and Charlie McCarthy
The Stylistics
The Bellamy Brothers

References 

Music venues in the San Francisco Bay Area
Demolished theatres in California
Demolished music venues in the United States
History of San Mateo County, California
Burned buildings and structures in the United States
1960s establishments in California